The Langove,or Langah are a Sulemani-speaking Baloch tribe in Balochistan.

Many Langove communities reside in Pakistani Balochistan, though further communities can be found in Punjab and Sindh. In Punjab and Sindh, Langove are called 'Langah' or 'Laangah' respectively.

Langove is a minor tribe of Baloch, with around four families claiming leadership (the title of 'sardar') of the Langove tribe. Most Langove speak the Sulemani dialect of the Balochi language, although some who live in proximity to Brahui tribes speak Brahui language.

Three salient sub-tribal Langove identity-groups are the Meeranzai, Halizai and Shadizai.

History 
According to the historian 'Abd al-Haqq, the origins of the Langove tribe are found in the fifteenth-century decline of the Delhi Sultanate, from which the Baluch tribe conquered territory of balochistan and Ruled  Years

References

Baloch tribes
Social groups of Pakistan
Brahui tribes